Parsottam Ukabhai Sabariya is an Indian politician. He was elected to the Gujarat Legislative Assembly from Dhrangadhra in the 2017 Gujarat Legislative Assembly election as a member of the Indian National Congress.

He was one of the four member of the Indian National Congress who shifted to Bharatiya Janata Party post 2017 Gujarat Legislative Assembly election. He won the in the by-election in 2019 from the same seat. he belongs to the Koli community of Gujarat.

References

1959 births
Living people
Gujarat MLAs 2017–2022
Bharatiya Janata Party politicians from Gujarat
Indian National Congress politicians from Gujarat
People from Surendranagar district